Roland Bergström was a Swedish football manager and former player. He managed the Icelandic national team in 1947.

References

Swedish football managers
Swedish footballers
Expatriate football managers in Iceland
Iceland national football team managers

Association footballers not categorized by position